Waverly Glacier is a narrow glacier flowing along the south flank of Mount Tricorn and entering Wright Inlet, on the east coast of Palmer Land. This glacier was photographed from the air by members of the United States Antarctic Service (USAS) in December 1940, and by the Ronne Antarctic Research Expedition (RARE) under Ronne in 1947. Named by Ronne after Waverly, New York City, home of the Kasco Mills. Mr. Marc Ivy and Mr. Edwin Knapp, officers of the Kasco Mills, contributed twenty tons of dog food to Ronne's expedition.

Glaciers of Palmer Land